George Parrish may refer to:
 George Parrish (racing driver)
 George Parrish (basketball)